Biswajit Datta was an Indian politician and a member of the Tripura Legislative Assembly from Khowai Assembly constituency.

References

Living people
Tripura MLAs 2013–2018
Communist Party of India (Marxist) politicians from Tripura
Bharatiya Janata Party politicians from Tripura